The 2022 Saint-Tropez Open was a professional tennis tournament played on hard courts. It was the second edition of the tournament which was part of the 2022 ATP Challenger Tour. It took place in Saint-Tropez, France between 10 and 16 October 2022.

Singles main-draw entrants

Seeds

 1 Rankings are as of 3 October 2022.

Other entrants
The following players received wildcards into the singles main draw:
  Dan Added
  Jurgen Briand
  Luca Van Assche

The following player received entry into the singles main draw using a protected ranking:
  Roberto Marcora

The following player received entry into the singles main draw as a special exempt:
  Nick Hardt

The following players received entry into the singles main draw as alternates:
  Frederico Ferreira Silva
  Louis Wessels

The following players received entry from the qualifying draw:
  Mattia Bellucci
  Salvatore Caruso
  Federico Gaio
  Nicholas David Ionel
  Valentin Royer
  Clément Tabur

The following player received entry as a lucky loser:
  Adrian Andreev

Champions

Singles

  Mattia Bellucci def.  Matteo Arnaldi 6–3, 6–3.

Doubles

  Dan Added /  Albano Olivetti def.  Romain Arneodo /  Tristan-Samuel Weissborn 6–3, 3–6, [12–10].

References

2022 ATP Challenger Tour
2022 in French tennis
October 2022 sports events in France